Valeria Bruni Tedeschi, also written Bruni-Tedeschi (born 16 November 1964), is an Italian-French actress, screenwriter and film director. Her 2013 film, A Castle in Italy, was nominated for the Palme d'Or at the 2013 Cannes Film Festival.

Personal life
Bruni Tedeschi was born in Turin, Italy, in the Piedmont region of Italy. Like her younger sister, Carla Bruni, she has settled in France. The girls were raised bilingually, as their family moved to Paris in 1973, fearing kidnappings and, later, the terrorism of the Red Brigades. She holds dual Italian and French citizenship. Her mother is Italian with French ancestry. Her father is Italian. She is second cousin of Alessandra Martines. Tedeschi had a relationship with the French actor Louis Garrel from 2007 to 2012. Together they adopted a girl from Senegal in 2009.

Selected filmography

She was present at the 2005 Berlinale, the Berlin International Film Festival, to promote two films she had acted in: Tickets (2005), a three-segment film directed by Ermanno Olmi, Abbas Kiarostami, and Ken Loach, and Crustacés et Coquillages, a comedy directed by the French duo of Olivier Ducastel and Jacques Martineau.

She also played a lead role in the short film Drugstore (2000), as part of a French anti-drug awareness raising campaign Drug Scenes (Original French title: Scénarios sur la Drogue), directed by Marion Vernoux based on a script by Eric Ellena.

Notable TV appearances
She recently appeared in one episode of the TV series In Treatment (2013).

Directing
Her debut film as a director, It's Easier for a Camel..., earned her two awards at the Tribeca Film Festival for Emerging Narrative Filmmaker and Best Actress in 2003. The film also won an award at the Ankara Flying Broom Women's Film Festival in 2004. It was also awarded Louis Delluc Prize for Best First Film. It was also entered into the 25th Moscow International Film Festival. According to Tim Palmer the film is an engaging example of contemporary French pop-art cinema, referring to directors who wittily merge the features of intellectual/arthouse cinema with mass/popular cinema, putting Bruni Tedeschi in the company of other filmmakers such as François Ozon, Maîwenn le Besco, Sophie Fillières, Serge Bozon, etc.

In 2007, Bruni Tedeschi directed Actrices, which won the Prix Spécial du Jury at the 2007 Cannes Film Festival. Her 2022 film Les Amandiers	(Forever Young) also premiered in the main competition of the 2022 Cannes Film Festival.

References

External links
 

1964 births
David di Donatello winners
French film actresses
Italian emigrants to France
Living people
Nicolas Sarkozy
Film people from Turin
Actors from Turin
French film directors
French women film directors
Chevaliers of the Ordre des Arts et des Lettres
Most Promising Actress César Award winners